Blacasset, Blacassetz, Blacssetz, or Blachessetz (fl. 1233–1242) was a Provençal troubadour of the noble family of the Blacas, lords of Aulps, in the Empire. He was probably a son of the troubadour Blacatz, as his vida alleges, though this has come into doubt. He was also distantly related to Charles I of Naples and Raymond Berengar IV of Provence. According to his vida, he was like his father in merit, good deeds, and munificence, and also reputed to be a good lover.

"Blacasset" is a diminutive of his father's name. A document of 1238 (two years after his father's death) mentions three sons of the elder Blacatz, two of which were named Blacacius. Blacasset was not a professional troubadour, but, like his father, an amateur. Eleven of his works survive, three sirventes, four cansos, and four coblas, including one single-stanza canso with a melody in F major, . This song was appended to a manuscript of the chansonnier du roi of Theobald I of Navarre in the early fourteenth-century. Among his other works are:
, a tenso with Guilhem de Montanhagol in the trobar clus style about a lady, Guiza (Gauzeranda) de Lunel
, a sirventes he wrote for the conte de Proensa (count of Provence)

Sources

Aubrey, Elizabeth. The Music of the Troubadours. Indiana University Press, 1996. . 
Bertoni, G. "Il complemento del conzoniere provenzale di Bernart Amoros." Giornale storico della letteratura italiana, 34 (1899) pp. 118–140.
Egan, Margarita, ed. and trans. The Vidas of the Troubadours. New York: Garland, 1984. .

Notes

1242 deaths
13th-century French troubadours
Year of birth unknown
People from Var (department)